Erlau is a municipality in the district of Mittelsachsen in Saxony in Germany. In 1994 it absorbed the former municipalities Beerwalde, Crossen and Schweikershain, and in 1999 Milkau.

References 

Mittelsachsen